The Doc Edge, formerly DOCNZ International Documentary Film Festival or simply DOCNZ Film Festival, and then Documentary Edge Festival, is New Zealand's Academy Award-qualifying international documentary film festival, run annually by the Documentary New Zealand Trust since 2005.

History 

The first Documentary Edge Festival, previously known as DOCNZ International Documentary Film Festival, or simply DOCNZ Film Festival, was launched in 2005 in Auckland by the then Prime Minister, Helen Clark.

The Festival was rebranded as Documentary Edge Festival in 2010, and has been branded Doc Edge since around 2016.

Traditionally held in May to June in Auckland and Wellington theatres, the festival chose to pivot during the coronavirus outbreak in 2020, taking the full festival online, opening up to a nationwide audience for the first time and increasing the size of the programme.

Description
Doc Edge is held annually, from April to June, in Auckland and Wellington. The Festival showcases the best selection of award-winning and critically acclaimed documentary films from New Zealand and around the world, and includes awards, Q&A sessions with filmmakers, and other events.

The Documentary Edge Awards 

The Documentary Edge Festival celebrates the best of documentary films by awarding artists in the following categories:

International selection:

Best International Short Documentary
Best International Feature Documentary
Best International Director
Best World Cinema
Best Human Rights
Best Generations
Best Heroes and Incons
Best Culture Vultures
And two different spotlight categories every year

New Zealand selection:

Best Feature Documentary
Best Short Documentary
Best Emerging Filmmaker
Best Director
Best Cinematography
Best Editing

References

External links
 

Documentary film festivals in New Zealand
Festivals in Auckland